Aurore Lalucq (born 17 April 1979) is a French economist and politician of the Place Publique party who has been serving as a Member of the European Parliament since 2019.

Political career
In parliament, Lalucq has since been serving on the Committee on Economic and Monetary Affairs. In 2020, she also joined the Subcommittee on Tax Matters. She has also been a substitute member of the Committee on International Trade (2019–2021) and the Committee on Employment and Social Affairs (since 2021).

In addition to her committee assignments, Lalucq is part of the Parliament's delegation for relations with the United States. She is also a member of the European Parliament Intergroup on Climate Change, Biodiversity and Sustainable Development, the European Parliament Intergroup on LGBT Rights and the Responsible Business Conduct Working Group.

Political positions
In May 2021, Lalucq joined a group of 39 mostly Green Party lawmakers from the European Parliament who in a letter urged the leaders of Germany, France and Italy not to support Arctic LNG 2, a $21 billion Russian Arctic liquefied natural gas (LNG) project, due to climate change concerns.

In 2022, Lalucq urged France's market regulator AMF to review its decision to register the Binance cryptocurrency exchange as a digital assets service provider, citing a Reuters investigation into money laundering on the platform.

References

1979 births
Living people
People from Longjumeau
Politicians from Île-de-France
Paris Dauphine University alumni
MEPs for France 2019–2024
21st-century women MEPs for France
Place Publique MEPs
Place Publique politicians